The Sport of Kings is a 1921 British silent sports film directed by Arthur Rooke and starring Victor McLaglen, Douglas Munro and Cyril Percival. The screenplay concerns a man who tries to prevent his wealthy ward from marrying a man involved in the horseracing world.

Cast
 Victor McLaglen as Frank Rosedale 
 Douglas Munro as James Winter 
 Cyril Percival as Harry Lawson 
 Phyllis Shannaw as Elaine Winter

References

External links

1921 films
1920s sports films
British silent feature films
British horse racing films
Films directed by Arthur Rooke
British black-and-white films
1920s English-language films
1920s British films
Silent sports films